The It Factor is an American reality television series which aired for two seasons on the American TV channel Bravo. It followed actors as they attempted to lead successful careers.

The first season profiled actors in New York City, and the second season did the same in Los Angeles.  Notable actors who appeared on the show include Oscar nominee Jeremy Renner, model/actress LisaRaye, Michaela Conlin (who went on to become a regular on the TV series Bones), Katheryn Winnick, and Godfrey (who became a spokesman for 7 Up).

External links
 
 

2000s American reality television series
2002 American television series debuts
2003 American television series endings
Bravo (American TV network) original programming
English-language television shows